San Miguel South Airport  is an airport serving San Miguel de Velasco in the Santa Cruz Department of Bolivia. The runway is on the south edge of the town.

See also

Transport in Bolivia
List of airports in Bolivia

References

External links 
OpenStreetMap - San Miguel
Bing Maps - San Miguel

Airports in Santa Cruz Department (Bolivia)